Sankar Guru is a 1987 Indian Tamil-language action film, directed by L. Raja and produced by M. Saravanan, M. Balasubramanian and M. S. Guhan. The film was shot simultaneously in Telugu as Chinnari Devatha with Raja Naidu as director. It stars Arjun, Seetha, Rajani and Baby Shalini. The film was released on 19 March 1987, and was commercially successful in both languages.

Plot 

Sankar Guru, an honest police inspector, fights for the rights of poor people. When Rekha falls in love with him, a few gangsters try to attack her to teach Sankar a lesson.

Cast 
Tamil version

Arjun as Inspector Sankar Guru 
Seetha as Seetha
Sasikala as Rekha 
Baby Shalini as Devi
Sarath Babu as Devi's father
Senthil as Sub-inspector Karuvayan
Senthamarai as Kanagaraj
Y. G. Mahendran as Dharmaraj
V. Gopalakrishnan as a police commissioner
Jeeva as Ethiraj
Rallapalli as police constable
Balaji as Nagaraj
Manorama as Seetha's mother
Rajya Lakshmi as Devi's mother
Mohanapriya
Chitralekha
Chandrakala
Chakravarthy as a police inspector
Pasi Narayanan as a police constable
Oru Viral Krishna Rao as a police constable
K. K. Soundar as a school master
Anumanthu as Seetha's father
Idichapuli Selvaraj as Kanagaraj's assistant
Omakuchi Narasimhan as Kanagaraj's assistant
Visu in a special appearance as a doctor 

Telugu version

Arjun as Inspector Babu
Seetha as Seetha
Rajani as Rekha
Baby Shalini as Devi
Sarath Babu as Devi's father
Rallapalli as Sub-inspector Raju 
Senthamarai
Y. G. Mahendra 
Jeeva 
Balaji 
Manorama as Seetha's mother
Rajya Lakshmi as Devi's mother
Mada Venkateswara Rao
Potti Prasad
Hema Sundar

Production 
AVM Productions wanted to remake the Bengali film Shatru (1984) in Tamil and Telugu. However, the remake rights proved too expensive, so the idea was dropped. Instead, AVM borrowed two scenes from that film and created a new story, titled Sankar Guru in Tamil and Chinnari Devatha in Telugu. Both versions were filmed simultaneously.

Soundtrack 
The music of Sankar Guru was composed by Chandrabose, with lyrics by Vairamuthu. The music of Chinnari Devatha was composed by K. Chakravarthy, with lyrics by Veturi.

Release and reception 
Sankar Guru was released on 19 March 1987. The Indian Express called it "absolutely unpretentious entertainer". Jayamanmadhan of Kalki, despite noting several flaws, appreciated the director for making an entertaining film from beginning to end. The film was commercially successful in both the languages it was made.

References

Bibliography

External links 
 

1980s masala films
1987 multilingual films
1980s Tamil-language films
1987 action films
1987 films
AVM Productions films
Fictional portrayals of the Tamil Nadu Police
Films directed by L. Raja
Films scored by Chandrabose (composer)
Films with screenplays by V. C. Guhanathan
Indian action films
Indian multilingual films
1980s Telugu-language films